Budinščina is a village and municipality in the Krapina-Zagorje County in Croatia connected by the state road D24 and R201 railway. According to the 2001 census, there are 2,503 inhabitants in the area, absolute majority of which are Croats.

Milengrad (Milen) castle is located in the municipality.

Settlements

The following settlements comprise the municipality:

 Budinšćina
 Gotalovec
 Grtovec
 Krapinica
 Marigutić
 Pažurovec
 Pece
 Pokojec
 Pomperovec
 Prepuštovec
 Sveti Križ
 Topličica
 Zajezda

References

Populated places in Krapina-Zagorje County
Municipalities of Croatia